Yuval, also known as Kfar Yuval, is a moshav in northern Israel. Located in the Galilee Panhandle between Metula and Kiryat Shmona, it falls under the jurisdiction of Mevo'ot HaHermon Regional Council.

History
The moshav was founded in 1953 by evacuees from the Old City of Jerusalem who originally arrived from Kurdistan on land that had belonged to the  depopulated Palestinian village of Abil al-Qamh. It was named "Yuval" (creek) after the Jordan river's tributaries in the area and also referring to Jeremiah 17:8 ("sends out its roots by the creek"). In the early 1960s most of the founders abandoned the moshav, and it was repopulated by Indian Jewish immigrants from Kochi.

The proximity of the moshav to the border of Israel with Lebanon has made it a target for terrorist attacks. In 1975 a group of terrorists infiltrated the moshav, took control of a residence, and killed three members of one family.

The main economic branches of the moshav, as of June 2004, are a chicken coop and plantations of avocado, apples, and plums. In recent years the moshav has relied on tourism from Israelis, and it is one of the leading places for village-style hospitality in northern Israel.

References

Moshavim
Populated places in Northern District (Israel)
Populated places established in 1953
1953 establishments in Israel
Cochin Jews
Indian-Jewish culture in Israel
Kurdish-Jewish culture in Israel